Kehukee Primitive Baptist Church is a historic Primitive Baptist church located near Scotland Neck, Halifax County, North Carolina.  It was built about 1742, and is a simple gable-front frame structure sheathed in weatherboard. A Gothic Revival style frame tower was added in 1901.  Also on the property is a contributing church cemetery established in 1889.

It was listed on the National Register of Historic Places in 1994.

History
The antimission controversy over whether churches or members should participate in mission boards, Bible tract societies, and temperance societies led the Primitive Baptists to separate from other general Baptist groups that supported such organizations, and to make declarations of opposition to such organizations in articles like the Kehukee Association Declaration of 1827. The Kehukee Primitive Baptist Church released a proclamation that they rejected formal service institutions outside of the church. The declaration proposed that "Upon examination, it was found that most of the churches had given their opinions; and after an interchange of sentiments among the members of this body, it was agreed that we discard all Missionary Societies, Bible Societies and Theological Seminaries, and the practices heretofore resorted to for their support, in begging money from the public; and if any persons should be among us, as agents of any of said societies, we hereafter discountenance them in those practices; and if under a character of a minister of the gospel, we will not invite them into our pulpits; believing these societies and institutions to be the inventions of men, and not warranted from the word of God. We further do unanimously agree that should any of the members of our churches join the fraternity of Masons, or, being members, continue to visit the lodges and parades, we will not invite them to preach in our pulpits, believing them to be guilty of such practices; and we declare non-fellowship with them and such practices altogether."

Notable ministers 
 Pleasant Daniel Gold

References

Baptist churches in North Carolina
Churches on the National Register of Historic Places in North Carolina
Gothic Revival church buildings in North Carolina
Churches completed in 1872
Churches in Halifax County, North Carolina
National Register of Historic Places in Halifax County, North Carolina
Primitive Baptists